Lena Sophia Degenhardt (born 31 May 1999) is a German female handball player for TuS Metzingen and the German national team.

She represented Germany at the 2021 World Women's Handball Championship in Spain.

References

External links

1999 births
Living people
People from Albstadt
Sportspeople from Tübingen (region)
German female handball players